Edmund Boyd Osler may refer to:

Edmund Boyd Osler (Ontario politician) (1845–1924), first elected in 1896 as Conservative member for West Toronto, Ontario
Edmund Boyd Osler (Manitoba politician) (1919–1987), first elected in 1968 as Liberal member for Winnipeg South Centre, Manitoba